Salvas may refer to:

People
 Gilles Salvas, Canadian politician
 Lise Salvas-Bronsard (1940–1995), Canadian economist
 Lou Salvas, Australian footballer
 Luc Salvas, Canadian pool player

Other
 Capela de Nossa Senhora das Salvas, chapel in Sines Municipality, Setúbal District, Portugal

See also
 Salva (disambiguation)